A Buffalope's Tale is a 2010 fantasy novel by Philip Caveney. It is a prequel to the Sebastian Darke series.

External links
 Philip Caveney's website, the first chapter, titled "The Great Migration", is posted

British fantasy novels
2010 British novels